Pentachondra involucrata, the forest frilly-heath, is a small Tasmanian plant in the family Ericaceae.

The specific epithet involucrata is derived from Latin, translated as "wrapper". It refers to the involucral bract, a whorl of bracts below the flower. It first appeared in scientific literature in 1810, in Prodromus Florae Novae Hollandiae, authored by the prolific Scottish botanist, Robert Brown.

References

Epacridoideae
Flora of Tasmania
Endemic flora of Tasmania
Plants described in 1810